Stop the World is the second studio album by American rock band Aranda. The album was released digitally on January 31, 2012, and as a CD on February 14, 2012. It was re-released on October 16, 2012. It includes the single "Undone", and other songs such as "One More Lie" and "Satisfied".

Background 
Grammy award-winning producer Johnny K contacted Aranda about working with them.

Critical reception 
Gene Triplett of The Oklahoman commented on the record, calling it "worth the four-year wait, for its certainly worth its sonic weight in gold, bringing on a 10-song load of the kind of hard-edged, guitar-driven, melodic, made-to-be-played-loud music that distinguished their 2008 self-titled debut". The album has sold 30,000 copies as of 2015.

Track listing

Singles

References

External links
 Aranda on Facebook

2012 albums
Aranda (band) albums
Wind-up Records albums
Albums produced by Johnny K